Vola Hanta Ratsifa Andrihamanana (born 28 September 1970) is a Malagasy swimmer who competed in the 1992 Summer Olympics in Barcelona. She competed in the 50 metres freestyle and the 100 metre breaststroke but did not proceed beyond the first heat in either, with times of 28.22 and 1:17.77 respectively in the two events.

She is the sister of Olympic swimmer Bako Ratsifa (born 1964), who swam in the 1980 games in Moscow.

References

1970 births
Living people
Malagasy female swimmers
Olympic swimmers of Madagascar
Swimmers at the 1992 Summer Olympics
African Games medalists in swimming
African Games bronze medalists for Madagascar
Competitors at the 1987 All-Africa Games
Competitors at the 1991 All-Africa Games